Anti-Hungarian sentiment (also known as Hungarophobia, Anti-Hungarianism, Magyarophobia or Antimagyarism) is dislike, distrust, racism, or xenophobia directed against the Hungarians. It can involve hatred, grievance, distrust, intimidation, fear, and hostility towards the Hungarian people, language and culture.

History

During the existence of the Kingdom of Hungary and Croatia, the Banate of Bosnia was accused of holding the alleged Cathar anti-pope Nicetas. Given that the Kingdom of Hungary and Croatia was under heavy Catholic influence, and Bosnia having a decentralized religious practice, Pope Honorius III would preach about invading Bosnia to pacify Nicetas, whilst Hungary would be able to incorporate Bosnia into its control. Later, in 1235, Hungary, with the justification of Pope Gregory IX would launch the Bosnian Crusade in order to subdue the Banate under its control. However, in 1241,  the Mongols invaded Hungary, thus completely abandoning the crusade and returning to Hungary to bolster their armies against the Mongols. Bosnia would then regaining its previously conquered territory. This conflict would fuel anti-Hungarian sentiment within the state, which even lasted beyond towards the Ottoman conquest of Bosnia.

During the era of the Austro-Hungarian monarchs, the court in Vienna was influenced by Hungarophobia, but the Hungarian landowner nobles also showed signs of Germanophobia. In the 18th century, after the end of Rákóczi's War of Independence, many immigrants came to the underpopulated southern parts of the Kingdom of Hungary: for instance, 800 new German villages were established. The authorities preferred non-Hungarian settlers. The Habsburgs regarded the Hungarians as "politically unreliable", and consequently they were not allowed to settle in the southern territories until the 1740s. The organized resettlement was planned by the Habsburgs. The resettlement policy was characterized as anti-Hungarian, as the Habsburgs feared an uprising of Protestant Hungarians.

Thousands of Hungarians were murdered in Transylvania (now part of Romania) in nine separate incidents during the 1848–1849 massacres in Transylvania, in which Romanians were also massacred in four separate occasions. These events were repeated in the 1940–1944 massacres in Transylvania, in which several massacres of Hungarians were perpetrated by Romanians and vice versa.

Modern

Czechoslovakia
Minorities in Czechoslovakia in 1918 to 1939 enjoyed personal freedoms and were properly recognized by the state. There were three Hungarian and/or Hungarian-centric political parties:
 Hungarian-German Social Democratic Party
 Hungarian National Party
 Provincial Christian-Socialist Party

After World War II, Czechoslovakia became a communist state; during the transition to a communist one-party state, decrees permitting the forced expulsion of German and Hungarian minorities from ethnic enclaves in Czechoslovakia came into effect, and Hungarians were forcibly relocated to Sudetenland, on the borders of Czechoslovakia. The Czechoslovak government deported more than 44,129 Hungarians from Slovakia to the Sudetenland for forced labor between 1945 and 1948, and the Beneš decrees remain legally in effect in the Czech Republic.

Slovakia

In Slovakia, Hungarian and pro-Hungarian political parties are a stable part of the political system. Anti-Hungarian sentiment had been criticized particularly during the third government of Vladimír Mečiar. In the past, so-called "Hungarian card" had been used mainly by the Slovak National Party (SNS) against the granting of a special status to the Hungarian minority; it argued for the complete assimilation of the Hungarian minority into Slovak society. It considers that Hungarians in Slovakia are actually overprivileged. After personnel changes in the presidium, SNS abandoned similar rhetoric and formed a common government with pro-Hungarian Most-Híd in 2016.

Anti-Hungarian rhetoric of some far-right organizations in Slovakia is based on historical stereotypes and conflicts in the common history as interpreted from nationalistic positions and recent events.  In such interpretations, the arrival of old Hungarian tribes is described as the occupation by barbarian tribes and contributed to the destruction of Great Moravia. Other negative sentiments are related to the period of Magyarization, the policy of interwar Hungary, the collaboration of Hungarian-minority parties with the Hungarian government against Czechoslovakia, the First Vienna Award and the Slovak–Hungarian War. Hungary is accused of still trying to undermine the territorial integrity of Slovakia, and local minority politicians are accused of irredentism. However, anti-Hungarian sentiment is not typical even for all far-right organisations, and the leader of the Slovak Brotherhood emphasized the need for collaboration with Hungarian far-right organisations against materialism and multiculturalism.

Women, Slovak or not, used to be required to affix the Slovak feminine marker -ová (used for declension of feminine names) at the end of their surname.

One incident of ethnically-motivated violence against Hungarians in Slovakia was at a football match in Dunajská Streda when Hungarian fans were badly beaten by the Slovak police.

The majority and the Hungarian minority describe their coexistence mostly as good. For example, in a public survey in 2015, 85.2% of respondents characterized their coexistence as good (63.6% rather good, 21.6% very good) and only 7.6% as bad (6.3% rather bad, 1.3% very bad).

Romania
In Romania, the Ceaușescu regime gave great focus to the ancient history of Transylvania. National communism in Romania made historical personalities of Hungary (such as John Hunyadi or György Dózsa) go through Romanianization and become more central figures in Romanian history.

The Civic Forum of the Romanians of Covasna, Harghita and Mureș, founded in 2005 with the aim of coordinating the ethnic Romanians at Covasna, Harghita and Mureș counties, has been accused of being anti-Hungarian.

Ukraine

Derogatory terms

In English
 Bohunk – combination of "Bohemian" and "Hungarian". An immigrant of Central European origin. A Laborer.
 Hunky – derived from "Bohunk"

In Romanian
The slurs Bozgor, Bozgoroaică and Bozgori are pseudo-Magyar terms of possible Romanian or Slavic origin describing Hungarians. A view is that it means "homeless" or "stateless".  speculated that the word is a combination of the Hungarian slur ba(s)zd meg ("fuck you") and the Romanian word for Hungarian, namely ungur.

See also

Edvard Beneš
Ethnic clashes of Târgu Mureș
Gheorghe Funar
Iron Guard
Ján Slota
Magyarization
Matica slovenská
Nicolae Ceaușescu
Noua Dreaptă
Romanian Hearth Union
Romanophobia
Slovakisation
Serbianization
World War I

References

Bibliography
 

 
Society of Hungary
Hungarian diaspora
Hungarian